St. Margaret's Co-educational English Secondary and Primary School is a co-educational secondary and primary school in Hong Kong near Nam Cheong station. It was established by the St. Margaret's Educational Organization, a Catholic religious-teaching educational organization.

St. Margaret's Co-ed is one of the limited numbers of schools in Hong Kong that teaches in English. The school curriculum uses English as the medium of instruction in all subjects with the exception of Chinese-related subjects and other modern languages (currently French, Spanish, Japanese and German).

St. Margaret's Co-ed monopolizes the English Speech Festival (non-open) each year, with a record-breaking 103 awards in the 2018–19 school year.

St. Margaret's is in division one for sport events and has a large share in the Hong Kong cross country team, owning 25% of the students in the team. This is an incredible feat, considering that St. Margaret's only has 300 boys and 300 girls, and has to compete with some of Hong Kong's traditional band 1 schools such as Ying Wa, coincidentally next to St. Margaret's.

History

St. Margaret's was founded in 1965, based on the traditions of Catholic Schools. In the beginning, the school was called St. Margaret's Girls College Kowloon, and only accepted female students. In 2001, the school joined the Direct Subsidy Scheme and started to accept boys. In September 2003, St. Margaret's made history as the first school in Hong Kong to adopt a through-train mode from Primary One to Secondary Six on the same school premises. It was also to be a co-educational, English-medium school.

Admission

Of the students starting Secondary One at St Margaret's, 80% of the total intake is from its primary section, with the remaining 20% coming from other primary schools. Applicants attend interviews in English which are conducted by the Principal and the Vice-Principal (Academic). Also taken into consideration are an applicant's performance in extracurricular activities, awards, certificates, and academic excellence. In addition, St. Margaret's applicants may choose to learn the subject Chinese with an easier curriculum as long as a foreign passport is presented. St. Margaret's welcomes students of different ethnicities and backgrounds to apply, and a diversity of different nationalities can be found in the school.

School badge
The school badge is composed of three elements: the cross, the fleur-de-lis and grain stalks.

The cross in the lower right corner indicates that the management of the school is based upon the spirit of Christ, while the three fleur-de-lis in the upper left corner symbolise the three great virtues as depicted in The Doctrine of the Mean and The Analects: wisdom, humanity and courage. The grain stalks at the bottom signify the good harvest after strenuous cultivation.

The overall meaning of the badge is that the management of the school is based upon the spirit of Christ, heading towards the three great Confucian virtues of wisdom, humanity and courage. It invokes enthusiasm in learning to seek wisdom, perseverance in performing humanity and awareness of shame to impel the courage to progress. Having these three virtues to cultivate oneself, with the determination to proceed and the persistence to learn, one can accumulate very rich knowledge and experience so as to reach the Confucian state. This is an ideal state of life, in which wise men (or women) are never confused, kind-hearted people are never worried and courageous men are never perturbed.

School motto

English motto
Pursuit of virtues to perfection with self-renewal spirit is meant to inspire students, to enable them to develop their inborn integrity, to renovate their rectitude, to rectify their conduct and act vigorously as well as to increase their knowledge as treasure. With all these values in mind, students can contribute a lot to the continuous advancement of the world so that many things can come to the realm of greatest excellence and perfection.

Chinese motto
明德新民，止於至善is a quote from the Classic of Rites Daxue: 大學之道，在明明德，在新民，在止於至善.

Houses
There are four houses in St. Margaret's. The four houses were named for the first four words of the school Chinese motto. They are Wise House, Moral House, New House and Civic House．

External links 

 School website

Primary schools in Hong Kong
Secondary schools in Hong Kong
Sham Shui Po District